Xanthoparmelia metastrigosa is a lichen which belongs to the Xanthoparmelia genus. It is found only in Australia. It is one of the few lichens that is listed as endangered.

Description 
Grows to around 7–12 cm in diameter with irregular and dichotomously branched lobes. The upper surface of the lichen is yellow-green surface.

Habitat and range 
Xanthoparmelia canobolasensis and Xanthoparmelia metastrigosa are known only from Mount Canobolas.

See also 

 List of Xanthoparmelia species

References 

metastrigosa
Lichen species
Lichens of Australia
Lichens described in 1981